Senator McGarry may refer to:

Edward McGarry (soldier-politician) (1820–1867), California State Senate
Edward McGarry (Wisconsin politician) (1817–1899), Wisconsin State Senate
Peter J. McGarry (1871–1940), New York State Senate